Zanclodesmus willetti is an extinct species of archipolypodan millipede that lived in the Late Devonian period of North America, approximately 380 million years ago. It was described in 2005 based on a fossil discovered in the Escuminac Formation of Quebec, Canada two years prior. Each trunk segment had long, sickle-shaped extensions (paranota) projecting laterally, and was decorated on the dorsal surface with low rectangular bosses ("bumps") bordered by crescent-shaped bosses. The genus name Zanclodesmus derives from Greek Zanklon, meaning "sickle", in reference to the long, curved paranota, and desmus, a common root word in millipedes. The species name willietti honors Miguasha National Park warden Jason Willett, who discovered the fossil.

References

External links
 Zanclodesmus fossil image from Miguasha National Park

†Zanclodesmus
Prehistoric myriapod genera
Devonian myriapods
Fossils of Canada
Fossil taxa described in 2005
Paleontology in Quebec
Paleozoic life of Quebec